Florence Roberts (March 16, 1861/1864 – June 6, 1940 was an American actress of the stage and in motion pictures.

Stock company actress
Born in New York City, she began acting onstage there. Her career began at the Brooklyn Opera House in Hoop of Gold. She secured her first stage role with the Denman Thompson Company and played leads with the N.B. Curtis Company. This experience led to appearances on Broadway. She once starred in Zala, a production of David Belasco. She headed a stock company in Philadelphia, for a period of 15 years. The actress made three world tours in stock. There was a South African repertoire and a tour of Australia with the Henry Duffy players. She also played in stock companies in Boston and other cities. 

In the early 1900s, she made annual tours under the direction of Frederick Belasco.

Film career
Roberts' success in motion pictures began with a Mack Sennett comedy. The film producer saw her on the stage in Your Uncle Dudley and cast her in Grandma's Girl (1930). Her earliest roles were in A Wife's Suspicion and A Wise Dummy, both in 1917.  Among her film performances, the Jones Family series is the most renowned. She played the role of Grandma.

Personal life 
Roberts married actor Walter Gale, and they had a son, Robert Gale.

Death 
Roberts died from cardiovascular disease at her home in Hollywood. She was buried in Forest Lawn Memorial Park, with funeral services performed at Wee Kirk of the Heather. 

Her eulogy was read by her adopted son, Edward Everett Horton, with whom she appeared in stock. The actress' death came unexpectedly three weeks after she had returned from a vacation trip to Panama. She went there following completion of 20th Century Fox's Jones Family series for the 1939–1940 season.

Partial filmography

 Allan Quatermain (1919) - Mrs. McKenzie
 The Man Who Was Afraid (1920) - Mrs. Robinson
 The Sleepwalker (1922) - Mrs. Fabian Dumond
 The Vulture's Prey (1922) - Landlady
 The Best People (1925) - (uncredited)
 The Eyes of the World (1930) - The Maid (prologue)
 Soup to Nuts (1930) - Junior's Mother (uncredited)
 Kept Husbands (1931) - Mrs. Henrietta Parker
 Bachelor Apartment (1931) - Mrs. Halloran (uncredited)
 Everything's Rosie (1931) - Mrs. Lowe
 Too Many Cooks (1931) - Mother Cook
 Fanny Foley Herself (1931) - Lucy
 Her Majesty, Love (1931) - Grandma (uncredited)
 Westward Passage (1932) - Mrs. Ottendorf
 What Price Hollywood? (1932) - Elderly Brown Derby Diner (uncredited)
 Make Me a Star (1932) - Mrs. Gashwiler
 The All American (1932) - Mrs. King
 Vanity Street (1932) - Annie - Fern's Maid (uncredited)
 Officer Thirteen (1932) - Granny
 Employees' Entrance (1933) - Shoe Customer (uncredited)
 Dangerously Yours (1933) - Mrs. Lathem
 Fast Workers (1933) - Short Window Shopper (uncredited)
 Daring Daughters (1933) - Ginger Hemingway - the Grandmother
 A Bedtime Story (1933) - Flower Shop Customer (uncredited)
 Lilly Turner (1933) - Wedding Guest Calling for Bride (uncredited)
 Melody Cruise (1933) - Miss Potts
 The Song of Songs (1933) - Book Store Customer (uncredited)
 Torch Singer (1933) - Mother Angelica
 Ever in My Heart (1933) - Eunice (uncredited)
 Blood Money (1933) - Judge's Wife (uncredited)
 Hoop-La (1933) - Ma Benson
 The Meanest Gal in Town (1934) - Mom - Old Stranded Actress (uncredited)
 Miss Fane's Baby Is Stolen (1934) - Agnes
 Success at Any Price (1934) - Cleaning Woman (uncredited)
 Student Tour (1934) - Elderly Woman (uncredited)
 Cleopatra (1934) - Lady Flora
 Babes in Toyland (1934) - Widow Peep
 Sons of Steel (1934) - Sarah Mason
 Rocky Mountain Mystery (1935) - Mrs. Ballard
 Public Opinion (1935) - Mrs. Buttons
 The Nut Farm (1935) - Ma Barton - Willie's Mother
 Les Misérables (1935) - Toussaint
 Every Night at Eight (1935) - Mrs. Murgatroyd (uncredited)
 Accent on Youth (1935) - Mrs. Benham (uncredited)
 Harmony Lane (1935) - Mrs. Foster
 Your Uncle Dudley (1935) - Janet Dixon
 The Country Doctor (1936) - Grandmother (uncredited)
 Every Saturday Night (1936) - Granny Evers
 Nobody's Fool (1936) - Mary Jones
 Back to Nature (1936) - Granny Jones
 Off to the Races (1937) - Granny Jones
 Nobody's Baby (1937) - Mrs. Mason - Landlady
 The Jones Family in Big Business (1937) - Granny Jones
 The Life of Emile Zola (1937) - Madame Zola
 The Prisoner of Zenda (1937) - Duenna (scenes deleted)
 Hot Water (1937) - Granny Jones
 Borrowing Trouble (1937) - Granny Jones
 Love on a Budget (1938) - Granny Ida Jones
 A Trip to Paris (1938) - Granny Jones
 Safety in Numbers (1938) - Granny Jones
 Personal Secretary (1938) - Mrs. J. J. Farrell
 Down on the Farm (1938) - Granny Jones
 The Storm (1938) - Mrs. Roberts
 Everybody's Baby (1939) - Granny Jones
 The Jones Family in Hollywood (1939) - Granny Jones
 Quick Millions (1939) - Granny Jones
 Too Busy to Work (1939) - Granny Jones
 Abe Lincoln in Illinois (1940) - Mrs. Bowling Green
 Young as You Feel (1940) - Granny Jones
 Double Alibi (1940) - Landlady (uncredited)
 On Their Own (1940) - Granny Jones (final film role)

References

External links

 
 
 
Brief article with color photo

1860s births
1940 deaths
Actresses from Maryland
19th-century American actresses
American stage actresses
20th-century American actresses
American film actresses
American silent film actresses
Burials at Forest Lawn Memorial Park (Glendale)
People from Frederick, Maryland